A crock is a pottery container sometimes used for food and water, synonymous with the word pot, and sometimes used for chemicals. Derivative terms include crockery and crock-pot.

Crocks, or "preserving crocks," were used in household kitchens before refrigeration to hold and preserve foods such as butter, salted meats, and pickled vegetables. Crocks are made from stoneware, which is a nonporous ceramic that is water-tight, even without glaze. 

Larger crocks (20-30 gallons) are used for curing meats. The meat is covered with a brine made of water, sugar, salt, and a small amount of sodium nitrate or salt peter. The meat is kept submerged in the brine by two semicircle weights designed to fit inside the crock. The crocks are then topped with a lid and stored in a cool, dry location.  

Smaller crocks (1-10 gallons) are commonly used for preserving vegetables such as cucumbers for pickles, and cabbage for sauerkraut. Preserving food in this manner allows people to keep summer vegetables throughout the winter months when gardens and crops are not producing. 

Vintage crocks can still be found and purchased. Aside from food storage, they're commonly used for decorative purposes, or storage containers, in interior design. 

Crocks of all sizes are still produced and sold today. 

A gypsy's crock is a (traditionally three-legged) cooking pot.

See also
 Beanpot
 Cassole
 Harsch crock
 Stoneware
 Cazuela

References

Cooking vessels
Pottery shapes
Serving vessels